The Cleansing Undertones of Wake/Lift is the companion EP to the full-length album Wake/Lift by post-metal band Rosetta, released in 2007 on Translation Loss Records. It contains various noise samples compiled by Michael Armine but is not meant to sync with Wake/Lift, yet samples of this release can still be heard in Wake/Lift.

Track list

Personnel
Production
 Vocals, lyrics, samples, and effects by Michael Armine

Artwork
 Art direction by Jessie Yanniell
 Art design by Adam Wentworth

References

Rosetta (band) albums
2007 EPs